The 2007 Individual Speedway Junior World Championship was the 31st edition of the World motorcycle speedway Under-21 Championships.

The title was won by Emil Sajfutdinov of Russia.

Calendar
 - Quarter-finals
 - Semi-finals
 - Final

Quarter-finals

Semi-finals

Final

September 9, 2007 (Sunday, 7pm local time)
 Ostrów Wielkopolski
Referee:  Mick Bates
Jury President:  Miloslav Verner
Attendance: 14,000
Best Time: 64,18 s (New Track Record)  Emil Saifutdinov (9 heat)
Stadium:
Name: Stadion Miejski
Capacity: 12,000
Host club: Intar Lazur Ostrów Wlkp. (Morten Risager and Luboš Tomíček in 2007 season was riders of Intar Lazur Ostrów Wlkp.)
Track:
Length: 372 m
Width of straight: 14 m
Width of bends: 16 m
FIM Licence N°: 789 (validity: 2007/2008/2009)

Heat after heat
 (65,00) Ivanov, Risager, Kling, Kennett
 (64,78) Saifutdinov, Holder, Puodzuks, Woelbert
 (65,35) Pavlič, Ząbik, Bridger, Tomíček
 (65,15) Hlib, Jonasson, Gutafsson, Šitera
 (65,56) Risager, Šitera, Puodzuks, Tomíček
 (64,28) Saifutdinov, Jonasson, Ivanov, Pavlič
 (64,78) Ząbik, Hlib, Kling, Woelbert
 (64,44) Holder, Bridger, Kennett, Gustafsson
 (64,18) Saifutdinov, Ząbik, Risager, Gustafsson
 (66,19) Hlib, Bridger, Ivanov, Puodzuks
 (65,19) Holder, Jonasson, Kling, Tomíček
 (65,47) Pavlič, Šitera, Kennett, Woelbert
 (65,33) Jonasson, Risager, Woelbert, Bridger (2e)
 (65,81) Holder, Šitera, Ząbik, Ivanov
 (66,28) Pavlič, Gustafsson, Puodzuks, Kling (X) Kling won, but after heat Referee exclusion him. Kling foul of Pavlic.
 (65,85) Saifutdinov, Hlib, Tomíček, Kennett
 (65,11) Holder, Hlib, Pavlič, Risager
 (65,84) Ivanov, Gustafsson, Tomíček, Woelbert
 (64,99) Saifutdinov, Šitera, Bridger, Kling (4e)
 (66,11) Kennett, Ząbik, Jonasson, Puodzuks

2e - mechanical failure on 2nd place

Final standing:
   Emil Saifutdinov (Russia)
   Chris Holder (Australia)
   Paweł Hlib (Poland)

References 
 Świat Żużla, No 4 (42) /2007, pages 58–59,

See also

2007
World Individual Junior
2007 in Polish speedway
Speedway competitions in Poland